This is a list of parks and commons in the Metropolitan Borough of Wirral.
 Arrowe Park
 Ashton Park
 Barnston Dale
 Bidston Hill
 Bidston Moss
 Birkenhead Park
 Caldy Hill
 Central Park
 Coronation Gardens
 Dibbinsdale
 Eastham Country Park
 Flaybrick Cemetery
 Heswall Dales
 Hilbre Island
 Meols Park
 Mersey Park
 North Wirral Coastal Park
 River Park
 Royden Park
 Thurstaston Common
 Upton Meadow
 Upton Park
 Vale Park
 Victoria Park
 Walker Park
 Warwick Park
 Wirral Country Park

Parks and commons in the Metropolitan Borough of Wirral
Parks and commons in Wirral Borough